This is a list of museums in Tuscany, Italy.

References

Tuscany